Klusmann is a surname. Notable people with the surname include:

 Charles Klusmann (born 1933), American pilot
 Steffen Klusmann (born 1966), German journalist

See also
 Klugmann
 Klussmann

German-language surnames